In mathematics, specifically order theory, the Dedekind–MacNeille completion of a partially ordered set is the smallest complete lattice that contains it. It is named after Holbrook Mann MacNeille whose 1937 paper first defined and constructed it, and after Richard Dedekind because its construction generalizes the Dedekind cuts used by Dedekind to construct the real numbers from the rational numbers. It is also called the completion by cuts or normal completion.

Order embeddings and lattice completions
A partially ordered set (poset) consists of a set of elements together with a binary relation  on pairs of elements that is reflexive ( for every x), transitive (if  and  then ), and antisymmetric (if both  and  hold, then ). The usual numeric orderings on the integers or real numbers satisfy these properties; however, unlike the orderings on the numbers, a partial order may have two elements that are incomparable: neither  nor  holds. Another familiar example of a partial ordering is the inclusion ordering ⊆ on pairs of sets.

If  is a partially ordered set, a completion of  means a complete lattice  with an order-embedding of  into . The notion of a complete lattice means that every subset of elements of  has an infimum and supremum; this generalizes the analogous properties of the real numbers. The extended real number line (real numbers together with +∞ and −∞) is a completion in this sense of the rational numbers: the set of rational numbers {3, 3.1, 3.14, 3.141, 3.1415, 3.14159, ...} does not have a rational least upper bound, but in the real numbers it has the least upper bound .

A given partially ordered set may have several different completions. The result is a distributive lattice and is used in Birkhoff's representation theorem. Among all possible lattice completions, the Dedekind–MacNeille completion is the smallest complete lattice with  embedded in it.

Definition
Then the Dedekind–MacNeille completion of  consists of all subsets  for which 
;
it is ordered by inclusion:  in the completion if and only if  as sets.

An alternative definition of the Dedekind–MacNeille completion that more closely resembles the definition of a Dedekind cut is sometimes used. If  is a cut then A satisfies the equation , and conversely if  then  is a cut. Therefore, the set of cuts, partially ordered by inclusion on the lower set of the cut (or the reverse of the inclusion relation on the upper set), gives an equivalent definition of the Dedekind–MacNeille completion.

With the alternative definition, both the join and the meet operations of the complete lattice have symmetric descriptions: if  are the cuts in any family of cuts, then the meet of these cuts is the cut  where , and the join is the cut  where .

Examples

Properties
When  is finite, its completion is also finite, and has the smallest number of elements among all finite complete lattices containing .

The Dedekind–MacNeille completion of a Boolean algebra is a complete Boolean algebra; this result is known as the Glivenko–Stone theorem, after Valery Ivanovich Glivenko and Marshall Stone. Similarly, the Dedekind–MacNeille completion of a residuated lattice is a complete residuated lattice. However, the completion of a distributive lattice need not itself be distributive, and the completion of a modular lattice may not remain modular.

The Dedekind–MacNeille completion is self-dual: the completion of the dual of a partial order is the same as the dual of the completion.

The Dedekind–MacNeille completion of  has the same order dimension as does  itself.

Algorithms
Several researchers have investigated algorithms for constructing the Dedekind–MacNeille completion of a finite partially ordered set. The Dedekind–MacNeille completion may be exponentially larger than the partial order it comes from, and the time bounds for such algorithms are generally stated in an output-sensitive way, depending both on the number  of elements of the input partial order, and on the number  of elements of its completion.

Constructing the set of cuts
 describe an incremental algorithm, in which the input partial order is built up by adding one element at a time; at each step, the completion of the smaller partial order is expanded to form the completion of the larger partial order. In their method, the completion is represented by an explicit list of cuts. Each cut of the augmented partial order, except for the one whose two sets intersect in the new element, is either a cut from the previous partial order or is formed by adding the new element to one or the other side of a cut from the previous partial order, so their algorithm need only test pairs of sets of this form to determine which ones are cuts. The time for using their method to add a single element to the completion of a partial order is  where  is the width of the partial order, that is, the size of its largest antichain.

As  observe, the problem of listing all cuts in a partially ordered set can be formulated as a special case of a simpler problem, of listing all maximal antichains in a different partially ordered set. Then the cuts in  correspond one-for-one with the maximal antichains in : the elements in the lower set of a cut correspond to the elements with subscript 0 in an antichain, and the elements in the upper set of a cut correspond to the elements with subscript 1 in an antichain.

Constructing the covering graph
The transitive reduction or covering graph of the Dedekind–MacNeille completion describes the order relation between its elements in a concise way:
each neighbor of a cut must remove an element of the original partial order from either the upper or lower set of the cut, so each vertex has at most  neighbors. In later work, the same authors showed that the algorithm could be made fully incremental (capable of adding elements to the partial order one at a time) with the same total time bound.

Notes

References

.
.
.

.
.
.
.
.
.
.
.
.
.

.

External links
MacNeille completion in PlanetMath

Order theory
Lattice theory